Macintosh Printer Secrets is a 408-page hardcover book written by Larry Pina. It was first published in 1990 by Hayden Books, and is now out of print. The book teaches about dot matrix and ink-jet printers on the Apple Macintosh personal computers.

See also 
 Larry Pina

External links
 Macintosh Printer Secrets Review

Computer books
Macintosh peripherals
Apple Inc. printers
Books by Larry Pina